Enrique Hidalgo born March 10, 1942 in El Tigre, Anzoátegui state (Venezuela), is one of the most influential popular musicians, children's poets and authors from Venezuela. Hidalgo's work includes  more than 500 songs, notably "Barcelonesa”, "Presagio", "Ladron de tu amor", '“La Carta” among others, more than eight children's educational books, and many musical productions written and arranged by himself.  Enrique Hidalgo is an accomplished musician and multi-instrumentalist (guitar,  Venezuelan cuatro, piano, harp and percussion). His compositions have been interpreted by artists such as Oscar D'Leon, Gualberto Ibarreto, Quinto Criollo, Barbarito Diez, Aida Cuevas, Serenata Guayanesa, Fania Allstars, Roberto Roena, Urbanda, Los Hidalgo, Hector Cabrera, Arabella, Juan Carlos Salazar, Edward Mena, among many others. Enrique Hidalgo is currently working in different  cultural and musical projects in Florida.

See also
Venezuelan music

External links
An interview with Enrique Hidalgo 

1942 births
Living people
People from El Tigre
Venezuelan composers
Male composers
Venezuelan folk musicians